The 2015 King's Cup is an international football tournament that will be held in Thailand from 1 to 7 February 2015. The 4 national teams involved in the tournament are required to register a squad of 23 players, including three goalkeepers. Only players in these squads are eligible to take part in the tournament.

Stage

Thailand 
Coach: Kiatisak Senamuang

South Korea Olympic 
Coach: Choi Moon-sik

Uzbekistan U-23 
Coach: Shukhrat Maqsudov

Honduras U-20 
Coach: Jorge Jiménez

|-----
! colspan="9" bgcolor="#B0D3FB" align="left" |
|----- bgcolor="#DFEDFD"

|-----
! colspan="9" bgcolor="#B0D3FB" align="left" |
|----- bgcolor="#DFEDFD"

|-----
! colspan="9" bgcolor="#B0D3FB" align="left" |
|----- bgcolor="#DFEDFD"

* recalled from club.

External links
 King's Cup
 Football in Thailand

2015 in Thai football cups
King's Cup